The Russian Volleyball Super League (RVSL) is the top league of Russian  professional volleyball. It was founded in 1992, and it is considered to be the continuer of the Soviet top league, founded in 1933.

Winners of the Soviet championship
 1933–1936 – Moscow.
 1938, 1939 – Spartak (Leningrad)
 1940 – Spartak Moscow
 1945–1948 – Dynamo Moscow
 1949, 1950 – VC CDKA Moscow
 1951 – Dynamo Moscow
 1952 – VC VVS MVO
 1953, 1954 – VC CDKA Moscow
 1955 – VC CSK Moscow
 1956 – Ukrainian SSR
 1957 – Spartak (Leningrad)
 1958 – VC CSK Moscow
 1959 – Leningrad
 1960–1962 – VC CSKA Moscow
 1963 – Leningrad
 1965, 1966 – VC CSKA Moscow
 1967 – Ukrainian SSR
 1968 – Kalev Tallinn
 1969 – Burevestnik Alma-Ata
 1970–1983 – VC CSKA Moscow
 1984 – Radiotechnik Riga
 1985–1991 – VC CSKA Moscow
 1992 – VC Shakhtar Donetsk

Teams
The following clubs competed in the 2022–23 season:

Russian volleyball Champions

Titles by club

See also
Volleyball in Russia 
Soviet Men's Volleyball Championship

References

 
Volleyball competitions in Russia
Russia
Sports leagues in Russia
Sports leagues established in 1992
Professional sports leagues in Russia